John Roach  (1862–unknown) was a Welsh international footballer. He scored twice on his only appearance for the Wales national team, against Ireland on 11 April 1885 in the 1884–85 British Home Championship. Wales won the match 8–2.

See also
 List of Wales international footballers (alphabetical)
 List of Wales international footballers born outside Wales

References

1862 births
Welsh footballers
Wales international footballers
Place of birth missing
Year of death missing
Association footballers not categorized by position